Avenger, Avengers, The Avenger, or The Avengers may refer to:

Arts and entertainment

In the Marvel Comics universe
 Avengers (comics), a team of superheroes 
Avengers (Marvel Cinematic Universe), a central team of protagonist superheroes of "The Infinity Saga" 
Avengers (comics) in other media
 The Avengers (comic book), several titles
 The Avengers: United They Stand, also known as The Avengers, a 1999 animated TV series 
 The Avengers: Earth's Mightiest Heroes, a 2010 animated TV series
 The Avengers (2012 film), or Marvel's The Avengers
 The Avengers (soundtrack)
 The Avengers (video game), planned for 2012 but unreleased
 Marvel's Avengers (video game), 2020

Fictional characters
 Avenger (comics), a fictional character in Magazine Enterprises comic book The Avenger
 Avenger (pulp-magazine character), in The Avenger 1939–1942
 Avenger, in visual novel video game Fate/hollow ataraxia
 Avenger, in 1960s TV series Birdman and the Galaxy Trio and 2000s parody Harvey Birdman, Attorney at Law
 Avenger, in AC Comics' Sentinels of Justice
 Avenger, in Way of the Tiger series of gamebooks, and the title of the first book

Film and television
 The Avenger (1931 film), an American Western
 The Avenger (1933 film), an American drama film
 The Avenger (1937 film), an Australian film
 The Avengers (1942 film), American title of The Day Will Dawn
 The Avengers (1950 film), an American swashbuckler film 
 The Avenger (1960 film), or Der Rächer, a West German film
 The Avenger (1962 film), or La leggenda di Enea, a 1962 Italian film
 The Avengers (TV series), a British series, 1961–1969
 The Avengers (1998 film), an American adaptation of the British TV series
 Avenger (film), a 2006 adaptation of Frederick Forsyth's novel
 Avenger (TV series), a Japanese anime series
 "The Avengers", a 1961 episode of the American TV series Alcoa Presents: One Step Beyond

Gaming
 Avenger (1981 video game)
 Avengers (1987 video game)
 Avenger (Dungeons & Dragons), a character class
 Way of the Tiger II: Avenger, 1986

Literature 
 The Avenger (novel), by Edgar Wallace, 1926
 Avenger (Shatner novel), a 1997 Star Trek novel by William Shatner
 Avenger (Forsyth novel), a 2003 novel by Frederick Forsyth
 The Avengers, a nonfiction 1968 book by Michael Bar-Zohar
The Avengers: A Jewish War Story, a 2000 nonfiction book by Rich Cohen

Music
 Avenger (British band), a heavy metal band
 Avengers (band), an American punk rock band
 Avengers (EP), 1979
 Avengers (album), 1983
 The Avengers (New Zealand band), a rock band
 Rage (German band), formerly named Avenger
 The Avenger (album), a 1999 album by Amon Amarth

Radio
 The Avengers (radio series), a South African spin-off of the TV programme
 The Avenger (radio program), the name of two American 1940s radio crime dramas

Military

Aircraft 

 Avro Avenger, a British 1920s biplane fighter
 General Atomics Avenger, an American developmental unmanned combat air vehicle
 Grumman TBF Avenger, a World War II American torpedo bomber
 McDonnell Douglas A-12 Avenger II, a proposed American attack aircraft

Ships 
 Avenger-class escort carrier, a class of British and American World War II ships
 Avenger-class mine countermeasures ship, of the U.S. Navy 
 HMS Avenger, the name of several Royal Navy ships
 USS Avenger, the name of several U.S. Navy ships

Tanks 
 Avenger (tank), a development of the Cruiser Mk VIII Challenger

Weaponry 

 GAU-8 Avenger, an aircraft cannon 
 AN/TWQ-1 Avenger, an American surface-to-air missile system

Organisations and teams
 Lesbian Avengers, a direct action group
 Los Angeles Avengers, an American arena football team
 White Eagles (paramilitary), or Avengers, a Serbian paramilitary group

Transportation

Air transport 

 Airborne Avenger, an American ultralight aircraft
 Avenger Field, an airport in Texas, U.S.
 Fisher Avenger, a Canadian ultralight aircraft

Vehicles 
 Avenger (truck), an American monster truck
 Argo Avenger, a Canadian all terrain vehicle
 Bajaj Avenger, an Indian motorcycle
 Dodge Avenger, an American car
 Jeep Avenger, a sport utility vehicle
 Fiberfab Avenger GT, an American kit car
 Hillman Avenger, later Chrysler Avenger and Talbot Avenger, a car

See also 
 
 
 Avenged (disambiguation)
 Avengers Assemble (disambiguation)
 French ship Vengeur ("Avenger'), the name of several ships
 Goel, a biblical "avenger of blood"
 Nakam (Hebrew, 'Revenge'), a group of Holocaust survivors seeking revenge for the Holocaust
 Vendicatori (Italian, 'Avengers'), a 12th-century Sicilian secret society